The elections for the Florida House of Representatives was held on Tuesday, November 6, 2012 to elect all the 120 seats in the Florida House of Representatives. The day also coincided with the 2012 United States presidential election, 2012 United States House of Representatives elections, and 2012 United States Senate election in Florida. The result was gain of 8 seats by the Democrats while Republicans maintained their control of the State House.

The resulting victors of the election took their seats for the 115th session which began in 2013.

Results

A Republican majority was secured, but was reduced from its prior supermajority by the electoral strengthening of the Democratic minority.

Complete list

References

Florida House of Representatives elections
2012 Florida elections
Florida House of Representatives